TuS Ahrbach is a German sports club based in Ruppach-Goldhausen, Rhineland-Palatinate. The club was founded in 1921 and today has departments for football, handball, and gymnastics. It is best known for its women's football section, which played in the German Bundesliga for several years.

History 
In 1921 SV 21 Goldhausen was founded. TuS Ahrbach's first predecessor was a club for athletics and football. Also in 1921, a similar club was formed in nearby Ruppach (SV Ruppach). Both clubs merged in 1937 to become SV Goldhausen-Ruppach. Scarcity of players led in 1951 to a merger with SV Heiligenroth. Goldhausen-Ruppach and Heiligenroth split up in 1959, but merged their clubs again in 1970, now under the name of TuS Ahrbach. In 1985, a new SV Heiligenroth separated from Ahrbach.

The women's football department was established in 1976. Its greatest success was the vice-championship in 1989, when they lost the final game to SSG 09 Bergisch Gladbach. In the following season they did not qualify for the initial Bundesliga though. After promotion a year later six seasons of Bundesliga football from 1991-1997 followed for Ahrbach. Despite having played in the semifinals of the championship in 1995, Ahrbach won just one game two years later in the 1996–97 season, leading to relegation for the club. Ahrbach then remained at the Regionalliga Südwest until the end of the 2009–10 season. Having failed to qualify for the 2. Bundesliga at its inception in 2004, the club was relegated from the now third-level Regionalliga. However, promotion back to the Regionalliga was achieved at the end of the 2011–12 season.

After a number of relegations the team now plays in the tier five Bezirksliga.

Notable players 
The players below all collected caps for the women's national team while playing at Ahrbach.

  Bettina Berens
  Christine Francke
  Marion Isbert
  Melanie Lasrich
  Ursula Lohn
  Heidi Mohr
  Jutta Nardenbach

Statistics 

* Ahrbach withdrew their team from the 1999–2000 cup.

References

External links 
 Official Website of TuS Ahrbach

Women's football clubs in Germany
Football clubs in Rhineland-Palatinate
Association football clubs established in 1921
1921 establishments in Germany
Frauen-Bundesliga clubs